The 1981 Cal State Northridge  Matadors football team represented California State University, Northridge as a member of the California Collegiate Athletic Association (CCAA) during the 1981 NCAA Division II football season. Led by third-year head coach Tom Keele, Cal State Northridge compiled an overall record of 6–4–1 with a mark of 2–0 in conference play, winning the CCAA for the first and only time in program history. The team outscored its opponents 203 to 174 for the season. The Matadors played home games at North Campus Stadium in Northridge, California.

1981 was the last season for CCAA football. All three 1981 football members of the CCAA (Cal State Northridge, Cal Poly Pomona, and Cal Poly) moved to the new Western Football Conference for the 1982 season.

Schedule

References

Cal State Northridge
Cal State Northridge Matadors football seasons
California Collegiate Athletic Association football champion seasons
Cal State Northridge Matadors football